Vattenfall UK (formerly: Nuon Renewables) is a subsidiary of Vattenfall headquartered in London.  It generates renewable energy, primarily through wind farms.

History
Vattenfall UK was established as Nuon Renewables in 2000.  It was a United Kingdom-based subsidiary of N.V. Nuon Energy. It has built wind farms across the UK with a potential annual power generation total of eight hundred megawatts.

In 2009, N.V. Nuon Energy was acquired by Vattenfall. In January 2012, it was merged with Vattenfall's other assets in the United Kingdom and was renamed Vattenfall UK.

In March 2020, Vattenfall UK sold its electric vehicle network to Statkraft and its supply side business,  Energy, to EDF Energy.

Operations

Vattenfall's core businesses in the United Kingdom are renewable power generation, heating, business-to-business sales and distribution.

The company owns and operates several wind farms, some as small as their ten megawatt Parc Cynog wind farm, to others as large as their current project, a two-hundred and ninety-nine megawatt development in Pen y Cymoedd Wind Energy.

References

External links
 

British subsidiaries of foreign companies
Electric power companies of the United Kingdom
Renewable energy companies of England
Vattenfall
Companies based in the City of London
British companies established in 2000
Energy companies established in 2000
Renewable resource companies established in 2000
2000 establishments in England